Paul Drayton may refer to:

Paul Drayton (athlete) (1939–2010), American athlete
Paul Drayton (composer) (born 1944), British musician